Konrad von Thüngen (c. 1466 – 16 June 1540) was the Prince-Bishop of Würzburg from 1519 until his death in 1540.

Biography
Konrad was born into a Franconian noble family about 1466.

He was appointed Prince-Bishop of Würzburg on 15 February 1519, with Pope Leo X confirming his appointment on 13 April 1519.

In 1525, the Prince-Bishopric of Würzburg was one of the main centers of the German Peasants' War, during which peasants, discontent with high taxes and forced labor requirements, rose en masse. The peasants found leaders in men like Götz von Berlichingen and Florian Geyer. During the course of the war, Würzburg was besieged by peasant armies and Konrad was forced to flee. The peasants were eventually repelled by the forces of the Swabian League, and Konrad returned to the prince-bishopric along with the forces of Louis V, Elector Palatine. Those who had participated in the revolt were punished harshly.

He died in Fortress Marienberg in Würzburg on 16 June 1540.

See also

References

1466 births
1540 deaths
Prince-Bishops of Würzburg
16th-century Roman Catholic bishops in Bavaria